Hans Reinhard, Hans Reinhardt or Hans Reinhart may refer to:

 Hans von Reinhard (1755–1835), Swiss politician, mayor of Zürich
 Hans Reinhart (poet) (1880–1963), Swiss poet and translator, see Hans-Reinhart-Ring
 Hans-Wolfgang Reinhard (1888–1950), German general

See also
 Georg-Hans Reinhardt (1887–1963), German general and war criminal during World War II